In physics, the Saha ionization equation is an expression that relates the ionization state of a gas in thermal equilibrium to the temperature and pressure. The equation is a result of combining ideas of quantum mechanics and statistical mechanics and is used to explain the spectral classification of stars. The expression was developed by Indian physicist Meghnad Saha in 1920.

Description
For a gas at a high enough temperature (here measured in energy units, i.e. keV or J) and/or density, the thermal collisions of the atoms will ionize some of the atoms, making an ionized gas. When several or more of the electrons that are normally bound to the atom in orbits around the atomic nucleus are freed, they form an independent electron gas cloud co-existing with the surrounding gas of atomic ions and neutral atoms. In turn, this generates an electric field, where the motion of charges generates currents, making a localised magnetic field, and creates the state of matter called plasma. 

The Saha equation describes the degree of ionization for any gas in thermal equilibrium as a function of the temperature, density, and ionization energies of the atoms. The Saha equation only holds for weakly ionized plasmas for which the Debye length is large. This means that the screening of the Coulomb interaction of ions and electrons by other ions and electrons is negligible. The subsequent lowering of the ionization potentials and the "cutoff" of the partition function is therefore also negligible.

For a gas composed of a single atomic species, the Saha equation is written:

where:

  is the density of atoms in the i-th state of ionization, that is with i electrons removed.
  is the degeneracy of states for the i-ions
  is the energy required to remove i electrons from a neutral atom, creating an i-level ion.
  is the electron density
  is the thermal de Broglie wavelength of an electron

  is the mass of an electron
  is the temperature of the gas
  is Planck's constant

The expression  is the energy required to remove the  electron.

where  is the energy of ionization.

Particle densities
The Saha equation is useful for determining the ratio of particle densities for two different ionization levels.  The most useful form of the Saha equation for this purpose is

,

where Z denotes the partition function.  The Saha equation can be seen as a restatement of the equilibrium condition for the chemical potentials:

This equation simply states that the potential for an atom of ionization state i to ionize is the same as the potential for an electron and an atom of ionization state i+1; the potentials are equal, therefore the system is in equilibrium and no net change of ionization will occur.

Stellar atmospheres
In the early twenties Ralph H. Fowler (in collaboration with Charles Galton Darwin) developed a new method in statistical mechanics permitting a systematic calculation of the equilibrium properties of matter. He used this to provide a rigorous derivation of the ionization formula which Saha had obtained, by extending to the ionization of atoms the theorem of Jacobus Henricus van 't Hoff, used in physical chemistry for its application to molecular dissociation. Also, a significant improvement in the Saha equation introduced by Fowler was to include the effect of the excited states of atoms and ions. A further important step forward came in 1923, when Edward Arthur Milne and R.H. Fowler published a paper in the Monthly Notices of the Royal Astronomical Society, showing that the criterion of the maximum intensity of absorption lines (belonging to subordinate series of a neutral atom) was much more fruitful in giving information about physical parameters of stellar atmospheres than the criterion employed by Saha which consisted in the marginal appearance or disappearance of absorption lines. The latter criterion requires some knowledge of the relevant pressures in the stellar atmospheres, and Saha following the generally accepted view at the time assumed a value of the order of 1 to 0.1 atmosphere. Milne wrote:
Saha had concentrated on the marginal appearances and disappearances of absorption lines in the stellar sequence, assuming an order of magnitude for the pressure in a stellar atmosphere and calculating the temperature where increasing ionization, for example, inhibited further absorption of the line in question owing to the loss of the series electron. As Fowler and I were one day stamping round my rooms in Trinity and discussing this, it suddenly occurred to me that the maximum intensity of the Balmer lines of hydrogen, for example, was readily explained by the consideration that at the lower temperatures there were too few excited atoms to give appreciable absorption, whilst at the higher temperatures there are too few neutral atoms left to give any absorption. ..That evening I did a hasty order of magnitude calculation of the effect and found that to agree with a temperature of 10000° [K] for the stars of type A0, where the Balmer lines have their maximum, a pressure of the order of 10−4 atmosphere was required. This was very exciting, because standard determinations of pressures in stellar atmospheres from line shifts and line widths had been supposed to indicate a pressure of the order of one atmosphere or more, and I had begun on other grounds to disbelieve this.

Stellar coronae
Saha equilibrium prevails when the plasma is in local thermodynamic equilibrium, which is not the case in the optically-thin corona.
Here the equilibrium ionization states must be estimated by detailed statistical calculation of collision and recombination rates.

The early universe
Equilibrium ionization, described by the Saha equation, explains evolution in the early universe. After the Big Bang, all atoms were ionized, leaving mostly protons and electrons. According to Saha's approach, when the universe had expanded and cooled such that the temperature reached about 3,000 K, electrons recombined with protons forming hydrogen atoms.  At this point, the universe became transparent to most electromagnetic radiation.  That 3,000 K surface, red-shifted by a factor of about 1,000, generates the 3 K cosmic microwave background radiation, which pervades the universe today.

See also
List of plasma (physics) articles

References

External links
Derivation & Discussion by Hale Bradt
A detailed derivation from the University of Utah Physics Department
Lecture notes from the University of Maryland Department of Astronomy

Atomic physics
Plasma physics